Valery Ilyich Khodemchuk (24 March 195126 April 1986) was a Soviet engineer who was the night shift circulating pump operator at the Chernobyl power plant and was the first victim of the Chernobyl disaster.

Biography
Valery Khodemchuk was born on 24 March 1951 in Kropyvnia, Ivankiv Raion, Kyiv Oblast.

He began his career at the Chernobyl Nuclear Power Plant in September 1973. During his first years at Chernobyl, he held positions of the engineer of boilers, the senior engineer of boilers of the workshop of thermal and underground communications, the operator of the 6th group, the senior operator of the group 7 of the main circulation pump of the 4th unit of the reactor workshop.

On the night of 26 April 1986, Khodemchuk was in one of the main circulation pump engine rooms in the reactor 4 building. At approximately 1:23 a.m. (Moscow Time), there were two powerful explosions in reactor four. The explosions ripped through the reactor and the surrounding building, including the main circulation pump halls. Valery Khodemchuk was the first person to die in the Chernobyl disaster as it is thought he was killed instantly when the number 4 reactor exploded.

His body was never found and it is presumed that he is entombed under the remains of the circulation pumps. A monument to Khodemchuk was built into the side of the Sarcophagus' interior dividing wall, to the east of the pump hall where he died.

Recognition
In 2008, Khodemchuk was posthumously awarded with the 3rd degree Order For Courage by Viktor Yushchenko, the President of Ukraine.

He was portrayed by actor Kieran O'Brien in the 2019 HBO miniseries Chernobyl.

See also
Deaths due to the Chernobyl disaster

References

1951 births
1980s missing person cases
1986 deaths
Deaths from explosion
Industrial accident deaths
Missing people
Missing person cases in Europe
People associated with the Chernobyl disaster
People declared dead in absentia
People from Kyiv Oblast
Recipients of the Order For Courage, 3rd class
Soviet engineers